Matching games are games that require players to match similar elements. Participants need to find a match for a word, picture, or card. For example, students place 30 word cards; composed of 15 pairs, face down in random order. Each person turns over two cards at a time, with the goal of turning over a matching pair, by using their memory.

Examples 
Type of game that may involve matching include:
 Dominoes
 Board games such as mahjong solitaire
 Card games such as Concentration or rummy
 Tile-matching video games

Types of matching 
Most matching games are objective, with correct answers in the rules for what counts as a match, pair, etc. Some however, like Dixit or Apples to Apples, are about subjective matches picked by one or more judge players. Here the correlation between a match holds value only as other players decide it, but rules dictate who will make those decisions and when.

Matching card games 
In card games of the matching group, players play cards in turn to a wastepile or tableau according to certain rules. A player unable to play a card by the rules is usually penalised by having to draw one or more extra cards, the aim usually being to shed all one's cards. There are three main sub-groups of matching card games:

 Stops Group. Cards are played in ascending sequence, often in suit
 Eights Group. Cards are played to a single pile, matching the previous card in suit or rank.
 Layout Group. Cards are added to a tableau or layout or moved around it in accordance with the rules.

References

Games of mental skill